Panagiotis Samilidis (born 9 August 1993) is a Greek swimmer. He won two bronze medals at the 2012 European Aquatics Championships.

At the 2016 Summer Olympics, he competed in the men's 100 metre breaststroke and the men's 200 metre breaststroke events. In the heats for the 100 m breaststroke, he finished 19th with a time of 1:00.35 and did not advance to the semifinals. In the heats for the 200 m breaststroke, he finished 27th with a time of 2:12.68 and did not qualify for the semifinals. He was also part of the men's 4 × 100 m medley relay team which finished 15th in the heats and did not qualify for the final.

References

External links
 

1993 births
Living people
Greek male swimmers
Male breaststroke swimmers
Swimmers at the 2010 Summer Youth Olympics
Swimmers at the 2012 Summer Olympics
Swimmers at the 2016 Summer Olympics
Olympic swimmers of Greece
European Aquatics Championships medalists in swimming

Mediterranean Games gold medalists for Greece
Mediterranean Games silver medalists for Greece
Mediterranean Games bronze medalists for Greece
Swimmers at the 2013 Mediterranean Games
Mediterranean Games medalists in swimming
Swimmers from Athens